Shango capicola is a species of African cribellate araneomorph spiders in the family Dictynidae. It is the only species in the monotypic genus Shango. The genus was first described by Pekka T. Lehtinen in 1967, and has only been found in South Africa.

References

External links

Dictynidae
Spiders described in 1909
Spiders of South Africa
Taxa named by Pekka T. Lehtinen